The shifted log-logistic distribution is a probability distribution also known as the generalized log-logistic or the three-parameter log-logistic distribution. It has also been called the generalized logistic distribution, but this conflicts with other uses of the term: see generalized logistic distribution.

Definition
The shifted log-logistic distribution can be obtained from the log-logistic distribution by addition of a shift parameter . Thus if  has a log-logistic distribution then  has a shifted log-logistic distribution. So   has a shifted log-logistic distribution if  has a logistic distribution. The shift parameter adds a location parameter to the  scale and shape parameters of the (unshifted) log-logistic.

The properties of this distribution are straightforward to derive from those of the log-logistic distribution. However, an alternative parameterisation, similar to that used for the generalized Pareto distribution and the generalized extreme value distribution, gives more interpretable parameters and also aids their estimation.

In this parameterisation, the cumulative distribution function (CDF) of the shifted log-logistic distribution is
 
Note that some references use  to parameterise the shape.

The probability density function (PDF) is 

again, for 

The shape parameter  is often restricted to lie in [-1,1], when the probability density function is bounded.

Related distributions

 When  the shifted log-logistic reduces to the log-logistic distribution.
 When  → 0, the shifted log-logistic reduces to the logistic distribution.
 The shifted log-logistic with shape parameter  is the same as the generalized Pareto distribution with shape parameter

Applications

The three-parameter log-logistic distribution is used in hydrology for modelling  flood frequency.

Alternate parameterization
An alternate parameterization with simpler expressions for the PDF and CDF is as follows. For the shape parameter , scale parameter  and location parameter , the PDF is given by  

The CDF is given by 

References

Continuous distributions